The World Won't Listen is a compilation album by English rock band the Smiths, released in the United Kingdom on 23 February 1987 by Rough Trade Records. The album is the second of three compilation albums—following Hatful of Hollow—released by the Smiths in the 1980s. It reached No. 2 on the UK Albums Chart, staying on the charts for 15 weeks.

Background
The album was conceived as a collection of the band's singles and their B-sides from 1985 to 1987. Additionally, the scrapped single "You Just Haven't Earned It Yet, Baby" (which was passed over for "Shoplifters of the World Unite") and the near-single "There Is a Light That Never Goes Out" (a single candidate from The Queen Is Dead that was passed over in favour of "Bigmouth Strikes Again") were included.

The title reflects Smiths singer Morrissey's belief that mainstream radio and record buyers weren't paying attention to the band. The compilation was succeeded three months later by Louder Than Bombs, released in the US by Rough Trade and featuring a similar, but extended track listing. The World Won't Listen contains two versions of songs that do not appear on Louder Than Bombs: the single version of "The Boy with the Thorn in His Side" and the single edit of "That Joke Isn't Funny Anymore". Additionally, The World Won't Listen contains different versions of two songs that would appear on Louder Than Bombs: "Stretch Out and Wait" features an alternate vocal, and "You Just Haven't Earned It Yet, Baby" appears in a slightly different and longer mix. In some territories, a double LP (and double cassette) second edition was released with an additional 12 tracks on the extra disk. The 12 extra tracks are mostly sourced (in order) from Louder than Bombs as well as "Panic" B-side "The Draize Train", which doesn't otherwise appear on either. The 2011 reissue replaced the single version of "The Boy With the Thorn in His Side" with the album version. Also of note is the fact that "Ask" appears on both The World Won't Listen and Louder Than Bombs in a slightly different and longer mix than its single version.

After WEA acquired the Smiths' back catalogue in 1992, all Smiths albums were re-released at mid-price, including The World Won't Listen, which was expanded to include a cover of "Golden Lights" and the original Rough Trade cassette edition bonus track "Money Changes Everything" (the "Bigmouth Strikes Again" B-side, also later released on the deluxe edition of The Sound of The Smiths).

Artwork and packaging
The CD sleeve for The World Won't Listen is based on the cassette version of the sleeve layout; the original album featured a larger picture of a 1960s fairground scene, of which this is a crop. The sleeve was designed by Morrissey, using a photo by Jürgen Vollmer from the book Rock 'N' Roll Times: The Style and Spirit of the Early Beatles and Their First Fans.

Release
The album was released on 23 February 1987, exclusively in the UK. It first charted on 3 March 1987, remaining in the top 100 for 15 weeks and peaking at No. 2. The World Won't Listen returned to the UK top 100 for two weeks in 1995, following its re-release by WEA. In 2011, The World Won't Listen was included in the Smiths' compilation box set Complete.

Track listing

Personnel
 Morrissey – vocals
 Johnny Marr – guitars, keyboard instruments, slide guitar on "Panic" and "That Joke Isn't Funny Anymore", harmonica on "Ask", mandolin on "Golden Lights", marimba on "The Boy with the Thorn in His Side"
 Andy Rourke – bass guitar, cello on "Shakespeare's Sister" and "Oscillate Wildly"
 Mike Joyce – drums, tambourine on "Stretch Out and Wait"
 Craig Gannon – rhythm guitar on "Panic", "Ask", "London", "Half a Person", "You Just Haven't Earned It Yet, Baby" and "Golden Lights", lead guitar on coda of "London", mandolin on "Golden Lights"

Additional musicians
 Kirsty MacColl – backing vocals on "Ask" and "Golden Lights"
 John Porter – sound effects on "Ask", drum machine and bass on "Golden Lights"
 Stephen Street – additional drum machine programming on "London", sound effects on "Asleep", sampling on "Rubber Ring"

Production
 Johnny Marr – producer (track 7)
 Johnny Marr, Morrissey and Stephen Street – producers (track 3 and 12)
 Morrissey and Marr – producers (tracks 4, 6, 10–11, 17)
 John Porter – producer (tracks 1–2, 9, 16, 18)
 The Smiths – producers (tracks 5, 8, 13–15)

Charts

Tribute

British artist Phil Collins produced an exhibition at the Dallas Museum of Art that included a three-part video project entitled The World Won't Listen, which was filmed in Turkey, Indonesia and Colombia. The video features young people performing karaoke versions of songs by The Smiths.

References

The Smiths compilation albums
B-side compilation albums
1987 compilation albums
Rough Trade Records compilation albums
Sire Records compilation albums
Albums produced by John Porter (musician)
Albums produced by Stephen Street